Port Campbell is a coastal town in Victoria, Australia. The town is on the Great Ocean Road, west of the Twelve Apostles, in the Shire of Corangamite.

History

The port and the town are named after Captain Alexander Campbell, a whaler and colonist of the Port Fairy region.

The town was settled in the 1870s, with the first wharf being built in 1880. Port Campbell Post Office opened on 19 March 1874. It was renamed Port Campbell West in 1881 when a new Port Campbell office opened near the wharf. 
There were hopes of a rail connection when the Timboon line opened in 1892 but the state government vetoed the idea in 1916.

The town became a centre of infamy in 1970 when the bodies of a family from Melbourne were discovered in a car that had fallen over a cliff, see Crawford family murder.

The town used to be the centre of a football competition known as the Port Campbell Football Association that operated from 1927, it reformed after WWII as the Heytesbury Football League and ran until 1991.

Port Campbell is now a popular tourist destination for visiting The Twelve Apostles, located 12 kilometres to the east of the town and the Port Campbell National Park, as well as maintaining a small crayfishing community.

Gallery

References

External links

Port Campbell - Official tourism website.
Official website for The Twelve Apostles Region of Victoria

Towns in Victoria (Australia)
Shire of Corangamite
Coastal towns in Victoria (Australia)
Western District (Victoria)
Ports and harbours of Victoria (Australia)